Grand Canyon Parkway is a  open air shopping center in Spring Valley, Nevada, located at Grand Canyon Parkway and Flamingo Road. The center encompasses  of space.

The mall anchors completed thus far are J. C. Penney, Kohl's, and Target (originally signed as Target Greatland).

History
The mall was proposed by Triple Five Nevada Development after plans to develop part of the site as a casino were abandoned.

On November 8, 2018, Sears Holdings announced that Sears Grand would be closing as part of a plan to close 40 stores nationwide. The store closed in February 2019.

Notes

Buildings and structures in Spring Valley, Nevada
Shopping malls in the Las Vegas Valley
Shopping malls established in 2005